Armutlu is a town and district of Yalova Province in the Marmara region of Turkey. The mayor is Mustafa Tokat (MHP).

See also
Armutlu Peninsula

References

External links
 
 District governor's official website 

Populated places in Yalova Province
Fishing communities in Turkey
Populated coastal places in Turkey
Districts of Yalova Province